Ladislaus Kanizsai (died 1477/78), was a military commander and officer of state in the Kingdom of Hungary in the 15th century.

Biography
Ladislaus was the son of Ladislaus Kanizsai, count of Sopron, y Dorothea Garai, daughter of Nicholas II Garai, Palatine of Hungary.

In 1456, he took part in the famous and victorious siege of Belgrade, which was an engagement between the forces of the Western Christianity and the Ottoman Empire, along with John Hunyadi, Regent of Hungary.

In 1459, he held the office of Voivode of Transylvania.

Baron of the Hungarian Kingdom with the title of Magnificus vir, he was later appointed as Master of the horse between 1464-1467.

References

Bibliography
 
 
 

1470s deaths
Year of birth unknown
Year of death uncertain
Voivodes of Transylvania
Hungarian soldiers
Hungarian Roman Catholics
15th-century Roman Catholics
15th-century Hungarian people
Masters of the horse (Kingdom of Hungary)